Christian Sandberg (born ) is a Swedish professional ice hockey player (centre) currently playing as captain with AIK of the HockeyAllsvenskan (Allsv). Sandberg has a brother, Filip Sandberg, and a cousin, Tobias Sandberg, both also playing professional ice hockey. Sandberg played as a youth with IK Bele.

Sanberg has only played two seasons away from AIK, featuring with HV71 in the Swedish Hockey League during the 2019–20 and 2020–21 seasons before returning to AIK 7 July 2021.

References

External links
 

1987 births
Living people
AIK IF players
HV71 players
Swedish ice hockey centres